Hamilton Beach Brands Holding Company is an American designer, marketer and distributor of home appliances and commercial restaurant equipment marketed primarily in the United States, Canada, and Mexico, including blenders, mixers, toasters, slow cookers, clothes irons, and air purifiers.

Until sometime in the 1980s the company's products were marketed under the brand name "Hamilton Beach Scovill", reflecting a merger that occurred in 1923. In 1990, the company merged with Proctor Silex, another household appliance manufacturer. Key market competitors include Cuisinart, Black & Decker,  Salton, De'Longhi, and Sunbeam.

History

Founded in April 1910 by inventor Frederick J. Osius in Racine, Wisconsin, the Hamilton Beach Manufacturing Company took its name from two men Osius hired, Louis Hamilton and Chester Beach. He hired Hamilton as the new company's advertising manager, and Beach to work as a mechanic. Osius did not care for his own name, so he paid Hamilton and Beach $1000 each for the right to use their names instead. The company mostly sold products that Osius had invented and patented, but Chester Beach had invented a high-speed fractional motor in 1905, which the company used in many of its products. Osius designed the agitator implement for the company's first milkshake machine, the Cyclone Drink Mixer, introduced in 1910. Hamilton and Beach left the company in 1913 to form their own firm, Wisconsin Electric Company. Osius sold Hamilton-Beach to Scovill Manufacturing in 1922 and moved to Millionaires' Row in Miami Beach. The Hamilton Beach drink mixer, with its characteristic spindle and metal container, was found at soda fountains of drug stores throughout North America. Other products included stand mixers (for making batter), fans, and hair dryers. The spindle drink mixer was expanded in the 1930s to enable multiple milk shakes to be processed at once. For a time, the brand was owned by NACCO Industries. The original company continues as the Hamilton Beach side of Hamilton Beach Brands, Inc. Since the 2000s, all of Hamilton Beach's appliances have been manufactured by subcontractors in China.

Products 

 Blenders
 Bread machines
 Coffeemakers
 Coffee grinders
 Coffee percolators
 Can openers
 Convection ovens
 Deep fryers
 Electric kettles
 Electric knives
 Food processors
 Ice cream makers
 Indoor grills
 Induction cooktops
 Juicers
 Mixers
  Microwave Ovens
 Ovens
 Pie irons
 Pizza makers
 Popcorn makers
 Rice cookers
 Steamers
 Toaster ovens
 Toasters
 Waffle irons

References

External links
 Hamilton Beach
 Proctor Silex
 Eclectrics all-metal appliances
 TrueAir AirCare appliances
 BrewStation 'cup-activated' dispensing, carafeless coffeemaker
 Hamilton Beach in Ukraine

Home appliance brands
Kitchenware brands
Home appliance manufacturers
Manufacturing companies based in Virginia
American companies established in 1910
Electronics companies established in 1910
American brands
Home appliance manufacturers of the United States
Companies listed on the New York Stock Exchange